Rvački Klub Partizan is a wrestling club from Belgrade, Serbia. The club is part of the sports society JSD Partizan.

History
The club was founded in 1948. It won 10 Yugoslavian championships. Later on the club had some difficulty but in the late 2000s (decade) it emerged as a power once again. It was second place in Serbia in 2007. Its success was only getting started. Winning two national championships in a row, in 2008 and 2009, the club went forward to win the European championship in 2009 despite financial difficulties.

Honours
Yugoslavian Championship
Winners (8) 1951, 1953, 1954, 1955, 1956, 1957, 1959, 1992
Serbian Championship
Winners (2) 2008, 2009
European Championship
Winners (1) 2009
European CELA Cup
Winners (2) 2009, 2010
More achievements can be seen on the club's official website here.
Yugoslavian Cup
Winners (3) 1953, 1954, 1955
Serbian Cup
Winners (12) 1998, 2002, 2004, 2005, 2006, 2009, 2010, 2011, 2012, 2013 2016, 2021
Serbian Supercup
Winners (2) 2002, 2006

References

External links 
Official Website

Sport in Belgrade
Sports clubs established in 1948
1948 establishments in Serbia